The Wells Harbour Railway was a  gauge railway that ran at Wells-next-the-Sea, Norfolk, England. The line operated for 45 years, from 1976 to 2021, when it was closed and replaced with a bus service.

History 
The Wells Harbour Railway was established in 1976 by Roy Francis. It opened in July of that year. There were two stations, Harbour and Pinewood, located at the town and seaward ends of the line respectively. At the latter there is a caravan park and beach. The railway provided an alternative to the long walk between Wells next the Sea and the beach at Wells Harbour. A bus route once served Pinewoods, but this was withdrawn. The engine shed was located at Pinewoods.

Over 80,000 passengers were carried in the first two years of operation. The railway was rebuilt and reopened in July that year. In 1980, Francis sold the Wells Harbour Railway and established the Wells and Walsingham Light Railway on part of the trackbed of the dismantled Wymondham to Wells line.

The railway was sold again in 1988, the new owners finding that it was in poor condition. In 1998, new carriages were supplied by Alan Keef of Ross on Wye. A new steam-outline diesel locomotive was supplied by Keef as the new carriages were too heavy for Weasel to pull. The railway was sold after the 2000 season, with the new owners improving the track and Pinewoods station. Another new locomotive was supplied in 2005.

Closure 
In April 2021 it was announced that the future of the railway was in doubt due to the retirement of the operators and landowner, the Holkham Estate, stating that it was reviewing whether to renew the lease given to the WHR's operators, which was to expire in 2022.

In September 2021 the railway closed, without fanfare, despite protest, with Holkham Estate issuing a briefing repeating closure, saying that all the railway equipment had been sold on to a different location in the UK and that there will be a "replacement service" for transport between the town and the harbour by 2022 season.

The track and rolling stock were removed over a 6 day period in early November 2021 with the support of staff from the purchasers, Lappa Valley Steam Railway where the rail will be reused to renew the life expired aluminium rail presently installed on the 10.25" railway and the locomotives and carriages supporting the existing fleet.

In February 2022, it was announced that an electric bus would replace the railway, with services augmented by a vintage open top bus during busy times.

In December 2021, one of the former locomotives Densil was purchased by the Watford Miniature Railway despite it leaving on the same lorry bound for Cornwall with the track and other rolling stock.

Operation 
The Wells Harbour Railway operated at weekends from Easter to the May Day bank holiday, then daily until the end of September, using a published timetable. It then operated at weekends until the end of October. The railway claims to hold the record of being the first railway of its gauge (or any smaller gauge) to operate a scheduled timetable passenger service.

Rolling stock

Locomotives

Former locomotives

Carriages
The original carriages used on the line were made by David King, who was the engineer who built Edmund Hannay. They were two open carriages and two covered carriages with wooden bodies on steel underframes. In 1998, four new covered carriages were made by Alan Keef. These have steel bodies on steel underframes.

References

External links
 Wells Harbour Railway Official website.

Wells-next-the-Sea
North Norfolk
Heritage railways in Norfolk
10¼ in gauge railways in England
1976 establishments in England